Jurgita Šiugždinienė (born 1 March 1972 in Kaunas) is a Lithuanian politician, a Member of the Seimas for Šilainiai constituency and former Kaunas City Councillor.

On 7 December 2020, she was approved to be the Minister of Education, Science and Sports in the Šimonytė Cabinet.

Biography 
Šiugždinienė studied in Kaunas University of Technology. She holds master's degree in Public Administration (1996) and PhD in Social Sciences (2008).

From 2008 to 2020, Šiugždinienė worked as Associate Professor in Kaunas University of Technology Faculty of Social Sciences, Humanities and Arts. From 2013 to 2015, she was the Dean of this faculty. Since 2015 until 2017, Šiugždinienė was Kaunas University of Technology Vice-Rector for Studies. Between 2017 and 2018 she held a position as the acting Rector of Kaunas University of Technology. Since 2018 was Head of the Strategic Group of the Homeland Union Secretariat. From 2019 to 2020 was member of Kaunas City Municipality Council.

Šiugždinienė is elected as Member of the Seimas for Šilainiai constituency in October 2020.

References

Kaunas University of Technology alumni
1972 births
Academic staff of the Kaunas University of Technology
Living people
Ministers of Education and Science of Lithuania
Politicians from Kaunas